Witness for the Prosecution may refer to:

"The Witness for the Prosecution", a 1925 short story by Agatha Christie
The Witness for the Prosecution and Other Stories, a 1948 collection containing the short story
Witness for the Prosecution (play), a 1953 play based on the short story
Witness for the Prosecution (1957 film), film by Billy Wilder based on the play
Witness for the Prosecution (1982 television production), a made-for-television adaptation
The Witness for the Prosecution (miniseries), a 2016 television serial on BBC One

See also
Witness to a Prosecution, an unrelated Hong Kong television drama series
 Witness (disambiguation)
 Prosecution witness